Mount Nebo is an unincorporated community in Nicholas County, West Virginia, United States. Mount Nebo has a post office with ZIP code 26679.

Mount Nebo is the home of the Summersville Lake Lighthouse, which was established on June 20, 2013. It is the only working lighthouse in the state of West Virginia.  It is listed in the FAA Charts, therefore designating it as an aeronautical navigational aid.  Students from neighboring counties, the Nicholas County Career & Technical School and the Fayette Institute of Technology helped build the 122 steps and the lamp room frame. Two students were hired to help complete the Lighthouse and intern under Master Welders from Amick's Welding. More information on southsideofthelake.com 
The community was named after Mount Nebo, in West Asia.

References

Unincorporated communities in Nicholas County, West Virginia
Unincorporated communities in West Virginia